Marsha Aizumi is an American author, educator, and LGBTQ+ activist. She co-founded the first PFLAG chapter for Asian-Pacific Islanders.

Activism 
Aizumi was motivated to improve schools for LGBTQ youth after seeing the harassment her transgender son faced. She founded the first PFLAG chapter for Asian-Pacific Islanders. The chapter began hosting events for specific ethnic groups, with Aizumi leading projects for the Japanese community such as the 2014 and 2016 Okaeri conferences. With the Los Angeles LGBT Center, Aizumi created the Courageous Conversations initiative to educate school district officials on LGBT youth issues and bullying. In 2012, she co-authored a book with her son. In 2015, Aizumi received a VH1 Trailblazer Honor for her allyship to the transgender community.

Personal life 
Aizumi and her husband adopted Ishinomaki-born Aiden Aizumi as a baby. Her child first identified as a lesbian before transitioning from female to male.

Selected works

References

External links 

 
 

Living people
Year of birth missing (living people)
Place of birth missing (living people)
21st-century American educators
21st-century American women writers
21st-century American non-fiction writers
American writers of Japanese descent
American women non-fiction writers
American educators of Japanese descent
Writers from California
Educators from California
Transgender rights activists
American LGBT rights activists
Activists from California
21st-century American women educators
Women civil rights activists